Tezirzaït (var. Tazerzait, Tezirzayt, Tezirzik) is a village in the Aïr Massif of northern Niger. Tezirzaït is the prime village of the Tezirzaït Valley, which forms the northern edge of the Tamgak Massif in the center-east Aïr Massif. The village is bordered on the north by the Temet massif, and runs out into the Tenere Desert and past the Chiriet massif on the east. It was twice the scene of heavy fighting during the Tuareg Rebellion. The village is the site of an oasis, a small Kel Owey Tuareg village, and nearby archeological sites, including rock carvings and neolithic graves.

See also
Battle of Tezirzait

References

Jolijn Geels. Niger. Bradt UK/ Globe Pequot Press USA (2006) 
Ezza Tours: Circuit traversee Air & Tenere

Populated places in Niger
Agadez Region